Jessica Uebelhart (born 16 October 1990) is a Swiss former professional racing cyclist. She rode in the women's team time trial at the 2015 UCI Road World Championships. Also in 2015, Uebelhart finished ninth at the White Spot / Delta Road Race, and tenth at the SwissEver GP Cham-Hagendorn.

References

External links

1990 births
Living people
Swiss female cyclists
People from Locarno
Sportspeople from Ticino